Khan Mohammadlu (also Romanized as Khān Moḩammadlū; also known as Khān Moḩammad) is a village in Angut-e Sharqi Rural District, Anguti District, Germi County, Ardabil Province, Iran. At the 2006 census, its population was 177, in 34 families.

References 

Towns and villages in Germi County